Ká Hó Port is one of two ports in Macau, China. It is located on Ilha de Coloane.

See also
 Macau Container Port

References

Transport in Macau
 
Coloane